Banani Lake is a lake in Dhaka, Bangladesh, bordering Banani, Gulshan, Korail Adarsha Nagar, and Mohakhali.

History
Following the July 2016 Dhaka attack, the government imposed a ban on boats in the lake because of security concerns. The lake has faced encroachment from the Karail area. The lake borders the largest slum, Korail, and the posh neighborhood of Gulshan.

References

Lakes in Dhaka city